Jelley is a surname. Notable people with the surname include:

Albert Jelley (1894–1966), New Zealand cricket umpire
David Jelley MLC. (1871–1907), South Australian trades unionist
Derek Jelley (born 1972), former professional rugby union player
J.V. Jelley (1856–1950), English artist, president of the Royal Birmingham Society of Artists
James Jelley (1873–1954), Australian politician and trade unionist
Sophie Jelley (born 1972), British Anglican priest
Stephen Jelley (born 1982), British auto racing driver
Tom Jelley (1926–2014), American football defensive end

See also
Jell (disambiguation)
Jelle
Jelly (disambiguation)